Johncy Itty was ninth bishop of the Episcopal Diocese of Oregon, serving from 2003 to 2008. He was elected on May 17, 2003.

See also
List of bishops of the Episcopal Church in the United States of America

References

External links 
Bishop transfers ecclesiastical authority to Standing Committee

Living people
Year of birth missing (living people)
Place of birth missing (living people)
Episcopal Church in Oregon
Episcopal bishops of Oregon
21st-century American Episcopal priests